Markus Larsson (born 9 January 1979) is a retired Swedish alpine skier who took part in the 2002, 2006, 2010 and 2014 Winter Olympics.

On 9 May 2016, he announced his retirement from alpine skiing.

World Cup results

Race podiums

Season standings

* Injured after 4 races.

References

External links
 
 
 

1979 births
Swedish male alpine skiers
Alpine skiers at the 2002 Winter Olympics
Alpine skiers at the 2006 Winter Olympics
Alpine skiers at the 2010 Winter Olympics
Alpine skiers at the 2014 Winter Olympics
Olympic alpine skiers of Sweden
People from Kil Municipality
Living people
Sportspeople from Värmland County